Khatia Buniatishvili (born 21 June 1987) is a Georgian concert pianist.

Early life and education
Born in 1987 in Batumi, Georgia, Khatia Buniatishvili began studying piano under her mother at the age of three. She gave her first concert with Tbilisi Chamber Orchestra when she was 6 and appeared internationally at age 10. She studied in Tbilisi with Tengiz Amirejibi and in Vienna with Oleg Maisenberg at the University of Music and Performing Arts Vienna. Her older sister, Gvantsa Buniatishvili, is also a pianist, and they have played together on numerous occasions.

Career
Buniatishvili signed with Sony Classical as an exclusive artist in 2010. Her 2011 debut album included Liszt’s Sonata in B minor, Liebestraum No. 3, and Mephisto Waltz No. 1.

Buniatishvili is a regular attendee of the Verbier Festival, and she performed Liszt's Sonata in B minor at the 2011 festival.

In 2012, Buniatishvili released her second album, Chopin, which featured solo piano works as well as Chopin's Piano Concerto No. 2 in F minor accompanied by the Orchestre de Paris and Paavo Järvi. The Guardian reported "This is playing straight from the heart from one of today's most exciting and technically gifted young pianists."

Discography

 2011 – Franz Liszt, solo piano album (Sony Classical)
 2012 – Chopin, with the Orchestre de Paris, conducted by Paavo Järvi (Sony Classical)
 2014 – Motherland, solo piano album (Sony Classical)
 2016 – Kaleidoscope, solo piano album (Sony Classical)
 2016 – Liszt Beethoven, with the Israel Philharmonic Orchestra, conducted by Zubin Mehta (Sony Classical)
 2017 – Rachmaninoff, with the Czech Philharmonic, conducted by Paavo Järvi (Sony Classical)
 2019 – Schubert, solo piano album (Sony Classical)
 2020 – Labyrinth, solo piano album (Sony Classical)

References

External links
 
 Khatia Buniatishvili at Sony Classical

1987 births
Living people
Classical pianists from Georgia (country)
Women pianists from Georgia (country)
Musicians from Tbilisi
Child classical musicians
Women classical pianists
People from Batumi
BBC Radio 3 New Generation Artists
20th-century classical pianists
20th-century musicians from Georgia (country)
21st-century classical pianists
21st-century musicians from Georgia (country)
20th-century women pianists
21st-century women pianists